Corunastylis nigricans, commonly known as the Kangaroo Island midge orchid is a small terrestrial orchid endemic to South Australia. It has a single thin leaf and up to twenty five purplish brown flowers with a shiny, hairless, dark purplish labellum. It is sometimes confused with Genoplesium nigricans which has differently coloured flowers and a much wider distribution. It is regarded as a synonym of G. nigricans by the World Checklist of Selected Plant Families.

Description
As with others in the genus, the flowers are inverted so that the labellum is above the column rather than below it. Flowering occurs between February and May.

Taxonomy and naming
The Kangaroo Island leek orchid was first formally described in 1810 by Robert Brown who gave it the name Prasophyllum nigricans and published the description in Prodromus Florae Novae Hollandiae et Insulae Van Diemen. In 2002, David Jones and Mark Clements changed the name to Corunastylis nigricans. The specific epithet nigricans is a Latin word meaning "blackish".

Distribution and habitat
Corunastylis nigricans grows in dry forest and coastal scrub on Kangaroo Island and the Eyre Peninsula.

References

External links
 

nigricans
Endemic orchids of Australia
Orchids of South Australia
Plants described in 1810